Year 485 (CDLXXXV) was a common year starting on Tuesday (link will display the full calendar) of the Julian calendar. At the time, it was known as the Year of the Consulship of Memmius without colleague (or, less frequently, year 1238 Ab urbe condita). The denomination 485 for this year has been used since the early medieval period, when the Anno Domini calendar era became the prevalent method in Europe for naming years.

Events 
 By place 
 Britannia 
 Aelle of Sussex, king of the South Saxons, fights the Britons at the stream of Mercredesburne. The battle ends in a draw (according to the Anglo-Saxon Chronicle).
 Period of Arthur's "twelve battles", during which he gains reputation for invincibility (approximate date).

 Asia 
 Emperor Xiaowen institutes an "equal-field" system of agriculture (juntian), assigning each peasant family about 19 acres (140 mu) of land. The land will be part minority divided by the farmer to be kept indefinitely and rest will revert to the state if the farmer dies or retires. The population is then divided by each other with the role of supervising one another. The result of this reform is that farmers mostly did not sell their holdings to large landowners. This provided the fiscal basis for the formation of the Sui and Tang dynasties.
 Prince Kenzō succeeds his adoptive father Seinei, and becomes the 23rd emperor of Japan.

 By topic 
 Religion 
 Peter the Fuller, patriarch of Antioch, is condemned and excommunicated by a synod of Western bishops at Rome.

Births 
 Cassiodorus, Roman statesman and writer (approximate date)
 Samson of Dol, bishop and saint (approximate date)
 Theuderic I, king of the Franks (approximate date)

Deaths 
 April 17 – Proclus, Greek Neoplatonist philosopher (b. 412)
 Abraham of Clermont, abbot and saint (approximate date)
 Asclepigenia, Athenian philosopher and mystic (b. 430)
 Fincath mac Garrchu, king of Leinster (Ireland)

References